Lluqu Chuyma (Aymara lluqu, lluqu lluqu heart, chuyma heart or another organ, also spelled Llocochuyma) is a  mountain in the Wansu mountain range in the Andes of Peru, about  high. It is situated in the Apurímac Region, Antabamba Province, Antabamba District. Lluqu Chuyma lies southwest of Llulluch'a.

References 

Mountains of Peru
Mountains of Apurímac Region